Chase Tenpenny (born August 6, 1991) is an American football punter.

Professional career

San Diego Chargers
Tenpenny signed with the San Diego Chargers on May 10, 2014. He was released by the Chargers on August 25, 2014.

Tampa Bay Buccaneers
Tenpenny was signed by the Tampa Bay Buccaneers to a future contract on January 5, 2015. Tenpenny was waived on April 16, 2015.

References

External links
Tampa Bay Buccaneers bio

1991 births
Living people
American football punters
Tampa Bay Buccaneers players
People from Oskaloosa, Kansas
Nevada Wolf Pack football players
Players of American football from Kansas